David Negrete Fernández was a Mexican colonel who participated in the Mexican Revolution. He was also a musician.

Biography 
David fought alongside military officer Felipe Ángeles as a part of División del Norte.

He married Emilia Moreno Anaya, who bore him:
Consuelo Negrete Moreno
Jorge Alberto Negrete Moreno
Emilia Negrete Moreno
Teresa Negrete Moreno
David Negrete Moreno
Rubén Negrete Moreno

David was a math teacher in Mexico City. He was also a father-in-law of Elisa Christy and María Félix.

See also 
Enrique Álvarez Félix, David's step-grandson
Miguel Negrete, relative of David Negrete

References

Mathematics educators
Mexican educators
People of the Mexican Revolution
Mexican soldiers
María Félix
Mexican musicians